Coi Coi-Vilu or Caicai-Vilu/Cai Cai Vilu  (from Mapudungun Kaykayfilu:  Kaykay a name, and filu "snake") is the Mapuche god of water (or goddess, in some versions found in Chiloé) and, according to Mapuche myths (later also found in Chiloé), supreme ruler of the sea and of all sea-dwellers.  This snake was a central figure in the Origin Of The Chiloean Archipelago. In Mapuche mythology, Coi Coi-Vilu is son of Peripillan (a Pillan).  

Some legends state that it is a parent of the mythical Trauco.

In popular culture
In the final shot in the trailer of Nahuel and the Magic Book by Latido Films, the Caicai raise to the ocean as Nahuel hugged an unconscious friend Fresia.

See also 
 Bakunawa
 Chilota mythology
 Horned Serpent
 Mapuche mythology
 Ten Ten-Vilu
 Kaikaifilu, an extinct genus of mosasaurs named after the deity
 Kaikaifilusaurus, an extinct genus of rhynchocephalians named after the deity

References

 Alberto Trivero (1999), Trentrenfilú, (in Spanish). Proyecto de Documentación Ñuke Mapu.
 Martinez Vilches, Oscar, Chiloe Misterioso (in Spanish). Pub. Ediciones de la Voz de Chiloe (circa 1998)

Mapuche gods
Chilote deities
Mythological aquatic creatures
Legendary serpents
Sea and river deities
Sea and river gods
Snake deities